Radomyshl (translit., Radomyshl’) is a historic city in Zhytomyr Raion, Zhytomyr Oblast (province) of northern Ukraine. Prior to 2020, it was the administrative center of the former Radomyshl Raion (district), and is located on the left bank of the Teteriv River, a right tributary of the Dnieper. It is located within the historic region of Right-bank Ukraine.

History

Since 1150, it was known as Mychesk. The settlement probably was destroyed during the Mongol invasion in 1240, after which the region fell under Mongol suzerainty. In the 14th century it became part of Lithuania and subsequently the Polish–Lithuanian union after the Union of Krewo (1385). The town was raided by Tatars in 1399, 1416 and 1462. As part of the Kingdom of Poland from 1569 it was known under the name of Radomyśl. Administratively it was part of the Kyiv Voivodeship in the Lesser Poland Province of the Polish Crown. In the beginning of the 17th century the Radomysl paper mill was founded, the first paper mill of present-day central Ukraine. After the Second Partition of Poland in 1793 the town was annexed by the Russian Empire and renamed to its current name. It was included in the Kyiv Governorate.

Radomyshl was historically a centre of Jewish settlement.  In the year 1797 a total of 1,424 people or 80% of the total population were Jewish. In 1847 it had increased to 2,734 and it further increased to 7,502 (67%) in 1897. In 1910 Radomyshl had a Talmud-Torah and five Jewish schools. In 1919 during the Russian Civil War a pogrom by militants under ataman Sokolovsky struck the community. Many were massacred and others fled. In 1926 a fire in the town damaged Radomyshl Synagogue. It was finally demolished in the 1930s. By 1926 the Jewish population had declined to 4,637 (36% of the total population). In 1939, 2,348 Jews were living in the town which represented 20% of all population.

World War II
During World War II, Radomyshl was occupied by the German Army from July 9, 1941 to November 10, 1943 then again from December 7 to 26, 1943. In August, 1941, the Germans established an open ghetto for the Jews. On August 5 and 6, 1941, 276 Jews were killed in two mass executions. On September 6, 1941, Sonderkommando 4a in collaboration with Ukrainian Auxiliary Police shot 1,107 adults and 561 children in the forest during the ghetto liquidation Aktion. Six mass graves have been discovered in the area. Only 250 Jews remained by 1970.

Sights
Nowadays Radomyshl is known primarily for the Museum of Ukrainian home icons located in Radomysl Castle, a private museum founded by Olha Bogomolets. Another landmark of the town is the St. Nicholas Cathedral, built in the 19th century.

Gallery

Notable people
Oleksandr Zinchenko (footballer for Arsenal F.C.)

References

External links 

 Radomyshl Ukraine  by Eli Kislyuk
 Radomyshl (Ukrainian and Russian language): Last news, city photos, events, forum; by Max Gryschenko
 RADOMYSHL IS OUR HOME photos, videos, radio, article, references, maps; by Pavel Tuzhyk
 The Official Site of Radomysl Castle 

Cities in Zhytomyr Oblast
Zhytomyr Raion
Radomyslsky Uyezd
Kiev Voivodeship
Shtetls
Drevlians
Cities of district significance in Ukraine
Holocaust locations in Ukraine